Pedro Pablo Osorio Nicolás (born 29 December 1965 in Orizaba, Veracruz) is a Mexican football manager and former player who played as a defender. Osorio played eight matches for Mexico between 1988 and 1991.

References

1965 births
Living people
People from Orizaba
Mexican footballers
Footballers from Veracruz
Association football defenders
Mexico international footballers
Liga MX players
Toros Neza footballers
Mexican football managers